Dawlat Shah District is located approximately 74 km from Mehterlam, the provincial centre of Laghman Province in Afghanistan. It is a mountainous district and borders Nuristan Province to the North and North-East, Alingar District to the East, Alishing District to the South and Kapisa and Parwan provinces to the West. The population is 36,950 (2019) - 50% Tajik, 40% Pashai and 10% Pashtun. It has 60 villages. On 20 May 2021 it was captured by Taliban.

The main source of potable and irrigation water in the district is a river which runs through the district from the Farashghan mountains. Communications are poor, and there is just one main road which runs to the district center. Good quality potable water is available only from springs. However, not all inhabitants of the district have access to these, and many use river water, which is not hygienic and causes water-borne diseases. For example, it was reported that in late 2001 / early 2002 cholera killed 13 inhabitants of Atto and Chekla villages. Water is carried long distances by women and girls. Spring water is also not a reliable source as the springs are affected by drought.As this is a mountainous area, there is little arable land. Due to the altitude of the land in many places it is not possible to irrigate it from the river. In the past spring water was used for irrigation but this is seasonal. A key source of income is forestry; however, much of the forest was cut down to provide wood for shelter re-construction. Some dry fruit trees were also burnt down during the war in 1980s.

The community has nevertheless themselves started to construct a road to Farashghan village, and has already completed 20 km. They have now sought assistance from WFP for a food for work programme to help them to complete the project. In general, however, there has been little activity by humanitarian agencies in this district.

The majority of the population suffer from poverty. It was reported that due to lack of work most young men are without occupations and many are armed and become involved in criminal activities. Nevertheless, it was reported that Dawlat Shah has good natural resources, such as forests, fruit and water.

Around half of the returnee families are currently rebuilding their homes. The houses are built in the traditional mountain style - with stones and wood. Some villages were burnt during the war in 1980s and the rest were destroyed during bombardment. Despite this, the district has a good supply of construction materials and many have succeeded in rebuilding their homes.

References

External links 
 AIMS District Map
 2003 AIMS District Profile

Districts of Laghman Province